The Bayer designation κ Lupi (Kappa Lupi) is shared by two star systems in the constellation Lupus:
κ1 Lupi (HD 134481)
κ2 Lupi (HD 134482)

References

Lupi, Kappa
Lupus (constellation)